The Clayton Formation is a geologic formation in Illinois. It preserves fossils dating back to the Paleogene period.

See also

 List of fossiliferous stratigraphic units in Illinois

References
 

Paleogene Illinois
Paleogene Georgia (U.S. state)
Paleogene Mississippi
Paleogene geology of Tennessee